Neil Haven Klock (November 9, 1896 – August 10, 1978) was an American politician. He served as a Democratic member of the Louisiana House of Representatives.

Klock was the son of John Charles Klock. He attended Texas A&M University and served in the United States Army during World War I. At one time he ran a syrup business with his brother Ernest Klock.

In 1940, Klock won election to the Louisiana House of Representatives. where he served until 1942. He was a farmer when he retired. Klock was a member of Trinity Episcopal Church in Cheneyville, Louisiana. At the time of his death he resided in Alexandria, Louisiana.

Klock died in August 1978 in the Veterans Administration Hospital in Alexandria, at the age of 81. He was buried in Trinity Episcopal Cemetery.

References 

1896 births
1978 deaths
United States Army soldiers
American military personnel of World War I
Democratic Party members of the Louisiana House of Representatives
20th-century American politicians
Businesspeople from Louisiana
Farmers from Louisiana
Burials in Louisiana
Texas A&M University alumni